Steve Lall (born 8 Jan 1944) is a former fighter pilot (Indian Air Force) and tea planter who turned his back to modern life in Delhi for a farmer's life in the Himalayan mountains and protagonist of episode two of season two of English broadcaster Ben Fogle's television program Ben Fogle: New Lives in the Wild. Lall has battled for decades to protect wilderness in Jilling near Nainital in Uttarakhand, India.

Lall runs Jilling Estate along with his wife Parvati and daughter Nandini. The estate consists of natural forests with rhododendron, oak, chestnut, apricot and pine trees.

References 

1945 births
Living people
Indian conservationists
Indian landowners
Indian planters
Indian Air Force personnel
Indian people of British descent
20th-century landowners